The Yugoslavian National Badminton Championships is a tournament organized to crown the best badminton players in Yugoslavia. They were held between 1994 and 2002, and were succeeded by the Serbian and Montenegrin National Badminton Championships and Serbian National Badminton Championships. In other parts of the former SFR Yugoslavia, national badminton championships are held, too (Bosnia and Herzegovina, Croatia, Slovenia).

Past winners

References
 badminton.org.rs

Badminton in Yugoslavia
National badminton championships
Badminton